Peter Paul Wiplinger (born 25 June 1939 in Haslach an der Mühl) is an Austrian writer and photographer.

Wiplinger was born in 1939 in Haslach an der Mühl in Upper Austria as the tenth child of a merchant family. He studied performance arts, German and philosophy. Since 1960 he has lived as liberal writer and photographer in Vienna. He is member of the Austrian P.E.N., auf the Austrian League for Human Rights, of the Documentation Center of Austrian Resistance against Nazisms, and he is directing member of the writers' association IG Autoren. He has received several awards, including the Austrian Cross of Honour for Science and Art, 1st class in 2003 and the Cultural Medal of Upper Austria in 2005.

Wiplinger published about 30 books, which have been translated to more than 20 languages. He primarily writes political essays, poetry and artistic photography.

Works (selection) 
 Hoc est enim, poetry, Munich 1966
 Gitter, poetry, Baden bei Wien 1981
 Herzschläge, poetry, Baden bei Wien 1989
 Lebenszeichen, poetry, Klagenfurt 1992
 Ausgestoßen, prose, Gosau 1994/2004
 Niemandsland, poetry, Eisenstadt 2002
 Lebensbilder, memories, Grünbach 2003
 Steine im Licht, poetry, Gosau 2007

References

External links 
 Austrian Literature Archive about Peter Paul Wiplinger
 

Writers from Vienna
1939 births
Living people
People from Rohrbach District
Austrian male writers
Austrian photographers
Recipients of the Austrian Cross of Honour for Science and Art, 1st class